Patrick Joseph Reid (17 March 1923 – 8 January 2016) was an Irish dual-code rugby centre. Reid played club rugby under the rugby union code for Garryowen, and played international rugby for Ireland, and was part of the Grand Slam winning team of 1948. The following season, he switched codes, joining professional rugby league club Huddersfield, before ending his league career with Halifax (Heritage № 601).

Rugby union
Reid came to note as a rugby player when he represented Garryowen in the 1940s; playing his first game against University College, Galway. In 1947 he won his first international cap, when he was selected to face Australia on their 1947–48 tour. The Irish team started the match with eight new caps, and Reid was partnered with Kevin Joseph Quinn at centre, the only player with any past international experience in the three-quarter positions. Australia were far too strong for Ireland, beating them 16–3.

Despite the loss, the Irish selectors kept faith with Reid and he returned into the Ireland team for the opening game of the 1948 Five Nations Championship. After the defeat by Australia there was little to suggest the Irish would have a successful season, though the campaign started well with a victory over France in Paris. It was a good game for Reid, as he also scored his first and only international points, running the ball under the posts after a tactical line-out. The following game saw Karl Mullen appointed Ireland team captain, and the tactical changes he brought to the team turned the squad into a far superior unit. Although Ireland did not possess the talent of other teams, as a unit they began to play a more defensive and tight game, taking their chances wisely. The new tactical play gave Ireland victory over England in a close game at Twickenham. The last two games of the Championship were both played at home, the first a victory over Scotland at Lansdowne Road, for which Reid was omitted. The Scottish victory gave Ireland the Championship title, but the team had not won a Triple Crown title since 1899. A victory over Wales would give Ireland the Triple Crown. Reid was reinstated back into the team for the Wales encounter, this time played at Ravenhill. The Irish pressured Wales in the first half, and a late try by prop John "Jack" Daly gave Ireland a famous Triple Crown and Grand Slam win; a feat the national team would not repeat until 2009.

The Irish team were carried from the ground by their supporters, and after a celebration dinner the team members went their own way. Reid, Daly and Des O'Brien went to a dance after the game, and spent the night in police custody after some "high jinks" with an Orange flute band.

Rugby league
At the end of the 1947/48 season, Reid made an economic decision to switch codes to professional rugby league. He originally joined English team Huddersfield, along with Triple Crown winning team mate John "Jack" Daly, but after a few months, Reid switched clubs to Halifax. In 1949 he was part of the Halifax team that reached the Challenge Cup final, losing at Wembley to Bradford.
Although Reid returned to Ireland just three years after leaving, any switch to league ended in lifetime bans from the union game. Despite this Reid continued to coach in Ireland behind the scenes.

Honoured by Rugby League Ireland
On 25 March 2004 six footballers were inducted into Rugby League Ireland's inaugural Hall of Fame at the Rugby League Heritage Centre in Huddersfield, they were; John "Jack" Daly (Huddersfield/Featherstone Rovers), Robert "Bob" Kelly (Keighley/Wakefield Trinity/Batley), Seamus McCallion (Halifax/Leeds/Bramley), Thomas "Tom" McKinney, (Salford/Warrington/St. Helens), Terry O'Connor (Salford/Wigan Warriors/Widnes Vikings), Patrick "Paddy" Reid (Huddersfield/Halifax). He died on 8 January 2016 in Limerick.

Notes

References
 
 

1924 births
2016 deaths
Expatriate rugby league players in England
Garryowen Football Club players
Halifax R.L.F.C. players
Huddersfield Giants players
Ireland international rugby union players
Irish expatriate rugby league players
Irish expatriate sportspeople in England
Irish rugby league players
Irish rugby union players
Munster Rugby players
Rugby league players from County Limerick
Rugby union centres
Rugby union players from Limerick (city)